Energylandia is an amusement park in Poland. It is located in Zator in Lesser Poland, which is in southern Poland.

History 
Energylandia opened on 14 July 2014. During its first year, it had three roller coasters: the Frutti Loop Coaster, Mars, and the Viking Roller Coaster. In 2015, three more roller coasters opened. These include the Energuś Roller Coaster (a Vekoma Junior Coaster), Roller Coaster Mayan (a Vekoma Suspended Looping Coaster), and Dragon Roller Coaster (a Vekoma Suspended Family Coaster). In 2016, the park opened Formuła, a launched roller coaster manufactured by Vekoma.

In October 2016, the park announced three new roller coasters to open for the 2017 season, these include Boomerang, Circus Coaster and Happy Loops. The park also announced plans for a new mega coaster that would open for the 2018 season. In October 2017, the name of the new mega coaster was revealed to be Hyperion. In addition to Hyperion, the park opened an Intamin water coaster named Speed in 2018.

On August 22, 2019, the park opened Zadra, a Rocky Mountain Construction roller coaster.

In September 2019, it was announced that Aqualantis will open in April 2020 including a brand new steel roller coaster Abyssus. The coaster is a Vekoma Shockwave coaster. In addition, a second Vekoma Family Boomerang would open to complement the new attraction. The opening of Aqualantis was delayed to July 2021 due to the COVID-19 pandemic. A Vekoma Mine Train named Choco Chip Creek is set to open in 2022 and will be a part of the park's new Sweet Valley area.

In 2021, the park was listed as one of Google's TOP 10 most searched tourist attractions in Europe (8th place) alongside the Eiffel Tower, Louvre Museum, Sagrada Familia,  Europa Park, Colosseum and Milan Cathedral.

Attractions 

The park has many attractions including rollercoasters, water rides and carousels, and others. Attractions are split into three 'zones' of the park, depending on how "extreme" the attraction is. There is also a water park which is not part of any zone. The four zones and their attractions are:

Fairytale Land 
In Polish: 'Bajkolandia'. This zone is for the smallest children visiting the park, featuring mild roller coasters, carousels and other child-friendly attractions.

Attractions

Family Zone 
In Polish: 'Strefa Familijna'. This zone of the park features attractions for the whole family, adults and children alike. It also features many so-called 'interactive' attractions like Splash Battle.

Attractions

Extreme Zone 
In Polish: 'Strefa Ekstremalna'. This zone has the park's most intense attractions such as the Mayan Roller Coaster.

Attractions

Dragon Zone 
In Polish: 'Smoczy Gród'.

Attractions

Aqualantis 
A water-themed zone opened in the season of 2021 referring to the myth of an ancient sunken city modeled on  Atlantis.
{| class="wikitable"
!Attraction 
!Type of attraction 
!Description and Features of Attraction 
!opened 
|-
|Abyssus
| Roller coaster 
|multi-launched coasterby Vekoma.
|2021
|-
|Light Explorers
|Roller Coaster 
|shuttle coaster – model Family Boomerang by Vekoma.|2021
|-
|Tidal Wave Twister
|Flat ride
|Model Disk’O by Zamperla.
|2021
|-
|Stormy Ship
|Flat ride
|Carousel moving on the track.  A smaller version of the Tidal Wave Twister attraction.
|2021
|-
|Grotto Expedition
|Boat ride.
|
|2021
|-
|Submarine Dive
|Carrousel
|Children's carousel with gondolas stylized as submarines.
|2021
|-
|Magic Pump
|Merry-Go-Round 
|Children's merry-go-round with leaning gondolas.
|2021
|-
|Burging Engine
|Carrousel
|A small carousel with carousels stylized as fire engines.
|2021
|-
|Aqua Jump
|
|A place for water acrobatics.
|2021
|-
|Choco Chip Creek
|
|A track past giant rocks from which chocolate sprouts.
|2022
|-
|Honey Harbour
|
|This ride offers enough excitement for children, teens and adults to create a great and unforgettable family experience.
|2022
|}

 Accidents 

 On August 16, 2018, a 37-year-old employee was struck and killed by a roller coaster train on the Hyperion coaster. He was attempting to retrieve a guest's phone when he was struck.
 On June 13, 2019, three people were injured when lightning struck a restaurant building near a pool.

 Controversies 

In 2019, the employee handbook contained a declaration of faith to be signed by the employee, including affirmations such as "I believe that God will give me everything I need to be successful". Energylandia's spokesperson stated that it comes from Napoleon Hill's The Law of Success'' and was intended to be purely motivational in nature, rather than religious.

References

2014 establishments in Poland
Amusement parks in Poland
Amusement parks opened in 2014